A salteña is a type of baked empanada from Bolivia.
 
Salteñas are savory pastries filled with beef, pork or chicken mixed in a sweet, slightly spicy sauce containing olives, raisins and potatoes. Vegetarian salteñas are sometimes available at certain restaurants.

Typically salteñas can be found in any town or city throughout the country, but each area has its variations; Cochabamba and Sucre claim to have the best version of this snack, and many will go out of their way to try the variation from Potosí. In La Paz, it is a tradition to enjoy salteñas as a mid-morning snack, although vendors often start selling salteñas very early in the morning. The pastries are sold anywhere from 7am to noon; most vendors sell out by mid-morning.

History 
Historian Antonio Paredes Candia states that during the early 19th century, Juana Manuela Gorriti was the first person to create the current version of this dish. This lady later married President Manuel Isidoro Belzu. Gorriti was born in Salta, Argentina and was exiled to Potosí, Bolivia during the Juan Manuel de Rosas dictatorship.  The Gorriti family endured extreme poverty, and they came up with the recipe in the early 19th century in order to make a living. A variation of these pastries was known at the time throughout most of Europe.

The product, nicknamed salteña, became very popular. Candia states that it was common to say to kids:  "Ve y recoge una empanada de la salteña" ("go and pick up an empanada from the woman from Salta"). In time most forgot the name Juana Manuela Gorriti, but not the nickname of her tasty snack, which eventually became a Bolivian tradition.

Consumption
Salteñas are juicy, like a stew in a pastry. The juiciness is achieved by making a stew out of all the ingredients and adding gelatin, so that the stew hardens in the refrigerator, and then slowly melts when they are baked.  This ensures that the dough does not get soggy even while providing a very juicy filling. They are more football-shaped than flat like empanadas.  The trick to eating them is to hold them upright, nibble the top corner and work your way down without spilling any of the hot juices. Llajua (Bolivian salsa) complements it well.

See also 
 Bolivian cuisine
 Pasty
 Xiaolongbao, another dumpling with a gelatin-based liquid filling 

Bolivian cuisine
Savoury pies
Snack foods
National dishes
Tapas
Meat dishes
Olive dishes
Street food
Stuffed dishes